Texas is an unincorporated community in Marion County, in the U.S. state of Alabama.

History
A post office called Texas was established in 1876, and remained in operation until 1929. The community was named after the state of Texas.

References

Unincorporated communities in Marion County, Alabama
Unincorporated communities in Alabama